Nelly Butete Kashumba Mutti (born 30 August 1956) is a Zambian lawyer and is first woman to serve as the Speaker of the National Assembly after going through unopposed.

References

Living people
Speakers of the National Assembly of Zambia
University of Zambia alumni
Academic staff of the University of Zambia
1956 births